Colts Neck Township is a township in Monmouth County, New Jersey, United States. It is located in the New York Metropolitan Area. As of the 2020 United States census, the township's population was 9,957, a decrease of 185 (−1.8%) from the 2010 census count of 10,142, which in turn reflected a decline of 2,189 (−17.8%) from the 12,331 counted in the 2000 census.

The municipality of Colts Neck Township was initially established by an act of the New Jersey Legislature as Atlantic Township on February 18, 1847, carved from portions of Freehold Township, Middletown Township, and Shrewsbury Township. The name was changed to "Colts Neck Township" as of November 6, 1962, based on the results of a referendum held that day.

The township has been ranked as one of the state's highest-income communities. Based on data from the American Community Survey for 2013–2017, Colts Neck residents had a median household income of $167,480, ranked fifth in the state among municipalities with more than 10,000 residents, more than double the statewide median of $76,475.

Community 

Colts Neck is a wealthy bedroom community in Central New Jersey, located within the New York metropolitan area. Many people choose to move to Colts Neck due to its open space and proximity to the Jersey Shore, while still being within commuting distance of New York City. The township's strict zoning ordinances have long kept out urban development and chain stores, allowing for locally owned businesses, while still being close to malls, movie theaters, and other amenities in neighboring communities.

Originally a farming community, Colts Neck has long been known for its large number of equestrian farms. From the 1950s into the 1970s many of Colts Neck's heavily wooded areas were developed with large colonial and ranch-style houses on acre-sized lots. In the 1980s and continuing into the 2000s much of the town's farm land has been replaced with large houses, mansions and sprawling estates, although a large number of equestrian farms remain. During this time period increasing home prices in northern New Jersey and New York City resulted in large numbers of people moving to central New Jersey, causing real estate prices in Colts Neck and surrounding towns to rise considerably over the course of the two decades. Colts Neck real estate prices remain high despite the economic downturn: as of November 2012, the average listing price of a house was $1,433,112 and the number of home sales is down 41.4% from the previous year.

Many of Colts Neck's residents are professional business people who commute into New York City's financial district, as could be seen in the unusual proportion of the small community who were lost in the September 11, 2001 terrorist attacks upon the World Trade Center. A memorial garden dedicated to the five members of the community who were lost was created at the municipal center by sculptor Jim Gary, a member of the community who was raised in Colts Neck. The central feature of the memorial garden is his sculpture of metal and stained glass.

In 2018, Colts Neck made national headlines when a man set his brother's mansion on fire, killing his brother, sister in law and their two children.

Geography 
According to the United States Census Bureau, the township had a total area of 31.79 square miles (82.34 km2), including 30.72 square miles (79.55 km2) of land and 1.08 square miles (2.79 km2) of water (3.38%).

Unincorporated communities, localities and place names located partially or completely within the township include Bucks Mill, Cooks Mills, Hominy Hill, Lippincott, Montrose, Phalanx, Scobeyville, Swimming River and Vanderburg.

The township borders the Monmouth County communities of Freehold Township, Holmdel Township, Howell Township, Marlboro Township, Middletown Township, Tinton Falls and Wall Township.

Economy 

Laird & Company produces Laird's Applejack at its facility in the Scobeyville section of the township. Since the end of distilling in Colts Neck in 1972, the company has had its apples picked and distilled in Virginia, and then brought north to be aged, blended and bottled at its facility in the township. The only remaining producer of Applejack in the United States, the company received the first license granted by the United States Department of the Treasury, which was granted in 1780.

Four JG's Orchards & Vineyards is a winery based in the township, named for the shared initials of the owners and their two children.

Demographics 

A 2007 study of New Jersey's highest-income communities shows Colts Neck had a median household income of $166,495, up from $109,190 in 2000, and the average household income was $232,520, which ranked it 16th in the state. The per capita income for the township as of 2007 was $70,781 up from $46,795 in 2000. The average household net worth, not including equity in homes, is $1,088,351 and the average disposable income for a household is $140,507.

2010 census

The Census Bureau's 2006–2010 American Community Survey showed that (in 2010 inflation-adjusted dollars) median household income was $154,491 (with a margin of error of +/− $16,020) and the median family income was $166,909 (+/− $14,315). Males had a median income of $117,917 (+/− $16,897) versus $67,188 (+/− $14,434) for females. The per capita income for the borough was $65,919 (+/− $6,519). About 2.0% of families and 2.5% of the population were below the poverty line, including 1.8% of those under age 18 and 2.3% of those age 65 or over.

2000 census
As of the 2000 United States census there were 12,331 people, 3,513 households, and 3,193 families residing in the township. The population density was 392.4 people per square mile (151.5/km2). There were 3,614 housing units at an average density of 115.0 per square mile (44.4/km2). The racial makeup of the township was 85.51% White, 7.89% African American, 0.23% Native American, 3.63% Asian, 0.01% Pacific Islander, 1.45% from other races, and 1.29% from two or more races. Hispanic or Latino of any race were 4.22% of the population.

There were 3,513 households, out of which 50.1% had children under the age of 18 living with them, 83.1% were married couples living together, 6.1% had a female householder with no husband present, and 9.1% were non-families. 7.5% of all households were made up of individuals, and 2.9% had someone living alone who was 65 years of age or older. The average household size was 3.17 and the average family size was 3.33.

In the township the population was spread out, with 29.2% under the age of 18, 12.1% from 18 to 24, 28.8% from 25 to 44, 21.7% from 45 to 64, and 8.1% who were 65 years of age or older. The median age was 33 years. For every 100 females, there were 109.6 males. For every 100 females age 18 and over, there were 113.4 males.

The median income for a household in the township was $109,190, and the median income for a family was $117,980. Males had a median income of $55,609 versus $38,457 for females. The per capita income for the township was $46,795. 2.8% of the population and 2.2% of families were living below the poverty line, including 2.2% of under eighteens and 2.8% of those over 64.

Government

Local government 

Colts Neck is governed under the Township form of New Jersey municipal government, one of 141 municipalities (of the 564) statewide that use this form, the second-most commonly used form of government in the state. The Township Committee is comprised of five members, who are elected directly by the voters at-large in partisan elections to serve three-year terms of office on a staggered basis, with either one or two seats coming up for election each year as part of the November general election in a three-year cycle. At an annual reorganization meeting, the township committee selects one of its members to serve as mayor and another as deputy mayor, each serving one-year terms.

, the members of the Colts Neck Township Committee are Mayor Joseph "J.P." Bartolomeo (R, term on committee ends December 31, 2024; term as mayor ends 2022), Deputy Mayor Sue Fitzpatrick (R, term on committee and as deputy mayor ends 2022), Tara Torchia Buss (R, 2023), Frank Rizzuto (R, 2024) and Michael S. Viola (R, 2023).

Frank Rizzuto was appointed to fill the seat expiring in December 2018 that had been vacated by Michael Fitzgerald.

Federal, state and county representation 
Colts Neck Township is located in the 4th Congressional District and is part of New Jersey's 11th state legislative district. Prior to the 2011 reapportionment following the 2010 Census, Colts Neck Township had been in the 12th state legislative district.

 

Monmouth County is governed by a Board of County Commissioners comprised of five members who are elected at-large to serve three year terms of office on a staggered basis, with either one or two seats up for election each year as part of the November general election. At an annual reorganization meeting held in the beginning of January, the board selects one of its members to serve as Director and another as Deputy Director. , Monmouth County's Commissioners are
Commissioner Director Thomas A. Arnone (R, Neptune City, term as commissioner and as director ends December 31, 2022), 
Commissioner Deputy Director Susan M. Kiley (R, Hazlet Township, term as commissioner ends December 31, 2024; term as deputy commissioner director ends 2022),
Lillian G. Burry (R, Colts Neck Township, 2023),
Nick DiRocco (R, Wall Township, 2022), and 
Ross F. Licitra (R, Marlboro Township, 2023). 
Constitutional officers elected on a countywide basis are
County clerk Christine Giordano Hanlon (R, 2025; Ocean Township), 
Sheriff Shaun Golden (R, 2022; Howell Township) and 
Surrogate Rosemarie D. Peters (R, 2026; Middletown Township).

Politics 
As of March 23, 2011, there were a total of 7,303 registered voters in Colts Neck Township, of which 952 (13.0%) were registered as Democrats, 2,805 (38.4%) were registered as Republicans and 3,539 (48.5%) were registered as Unaffiliated. There were 7 voters registered as Libertarians or Greens.

In the 2012 presidential election, Republican Mitt Romney received 72.6% of the vote (3,912 cast), ahead of Democrat Barack Obama with 26.4% (1,420 votes), and other candidates with 1.0% (55 votes), among the 5,423 ballots cast by the township's 7,634 registered voters (36 ballots were spoiled), for a turnout of 71.0%. In the 2008 presidential election, Republican John McCain received 67.8% of the vote (3,970 cast), ahead of Democrat Barack Obama with 30.4% (1,781 votes) and other candidates with 0.8% (46 votes), among the 5,856 ballots cast by the township's 7,581 registered voters, for a turnout of 77.2%. In the 2004 presidential election, Republican George W. Bush received 68.8% of the vote (3,929 ballots cast), outpolling Democrat John Kerry with 28.5% (1,629 votes) and other candidates with 0.5% (37 votes), among the 5,708 ballots cast by the township's 7,200 registered voters, for a turnout percentage of 79.3.

In the 2013 gubernatorial election, Republican Chris Christie received 83.5% of the vote (2,630 cast), ahead of Democrat Barbara Buono with 15.2% (478 votes), and other candidates with 1.3% (40 votes), among the 3,189 ballots cast by the township's 7,624 registered voters (41 ballots were spoiled), for a turnout of 41.8%. In the 2009 gubernatorial election, Republican Chris Christie received 76.7% of the vote (3,174 ballots cast), ahead of  Democrat Jon Corzine with 17.9% (741 votes), Independent Chris Daggett with 4.7% (193 votes) and other candidates with 0.4% (16 votes), among the 4,139 ballots cast by the township's 7,433 registered voters, yielding a 55.7% turnout.

Education 

Students in public school attend the Colts Neck School District for pre-kindergarten through eighth grade. As of the 2020–21 school year, the district, comprised of three schools, had an enrollment of 955 students and 116.3 classroom teachers (on an FTE basis), for a student–teacher ratio of 8.2:1. Schools in the district (with 2020–21 enrollment data from the National Center for Education Statistics) are 
Conover Road Primary School with 374 students in grades PreK-2, 
Conover Road Elementary School with 310 students in grades 3-5 and 
Cedar Drive Middle School with 324 students in grades 6-8).

Students in public school for ninth through twelfth grades attend Colts Neck High School, along with students from portions of Howell Township. The Freehold Regional High School District (FRHSD) also serves students from Englishtown, Farmingdale, Freehold Borough, Freehold Township, Howell Township, Manalapan Township and Marlboro Township. As of the 2020–21 school year, the high school had an enrollment of 1,316 students and 91.4 classroom teachers (on an FTE basis), for a student–teacher ratio of 14.4:1. Students may apply to attend one of the district's six specialized learning centers, including the Humanities Learning Center hosted at Howell High School. The FRHSD board of education has nine members, who are elected to three-year terms from each of the constituent districts. Each member is allocated a fraction of a vote that totals to nine points, with Colts Neck Township allocated one member, who has 1.0 votes.

About 20% of the township's K–8 population attend private schools. These include Ranney School, Rumson Country Day School and St. Leo the Great School. At the high school level about half of all students attend private schools, including Christian Brothers Academy, Lawrenceville School, Peddie School, Ranney School, Red Bank Catholic High School, Mater Dei High School and St. John Vianney High School.

Transportation

Roads and highways

Two major state roads pass through the township: Route 18 (the freeway portion) and Route 34. Major county roads that traverse the township are CR 520 (along the border) and CR 537.

The Garden State Parkway is accessible in neighboring Holmdel Township, Middletown Township, Tinton Falls and Wall Township. Interstate 195 is also outside the township, in neighboring Wall and Howell Township.

Public transportation
NJ Transit provides local bus service between Freehold Township and Sea Bright on the 838 route.

Ferry service is available through the SeaStreak service in Highlands, a trip that involves about a 25-30 minute drive from Colts Neck Township (depending on the section of town) to reach the departing terminal. SeaStreak offers ferry service to New York City with trips to Pier 11 (on the East River at Wall Street) and East 35th Street in Manhattan. The ferry service also offers seasonal travel, such as to the public beaches on Sandy Hook, baseball games at Yankee Stadium and Citi Field, trips to Broadway matinees, Martha's Vineyard in Massachusetts, college football games at West Point, fall foliage in the Hudson Valley, and to the Macy's Thanksgiving Day Parade, among other excursions.

Monmouth Executive Airport in Farmingdale supplies short-distance flights to surrounding areas and is the closest air transportation service.

Notable people

People who were born in, residents of, or otherwise closely associated with Colts Neck Township include:

 Vincent Accettola (born 1994), producer and arts administrator, currently serving as Managing Director of the National Youth Orchestra of China
 Robert E. Brennan (born 1944), entrepreneur who built the penny stock brokerage firm, First Jersey Securities; Brennan was later convicted of fraud and was arrested at his home in Colts Neck in 2001
 David Bryan (born 1962), of the band Bon Jovi
 Lillian G. Burry, member of the Monmouth County Board of Chosen Freeholders who had served as mayor of Colts Neck
 Caroline Casagrande (born 1976), Assemblywoman for the 12th District of the New Jersey General Assembly
 Wayne Chrebet (born 1973), now-retired wide receiver who spent his career with the New York Jets
 Steven E. Fass, President & CEO of White Mountains Insurance Group
 Jim Gary (1939–2006), sculptor, popularly known for his large, colorful creations of dinosaurs made from discarded automobile parts
 Al Golden (born 1969), professional and college football coach
 Charles Haight (1838–1891), United States congressman who represented New Jersey's 2nd congressional district from 1867 to 1871
 Walt Hameline (born 1951), Director of Athletics and former head football coach at Wagner College
 Pete Harnisch (born 1966), former Major League Baseball right-handed starting pitcher who played for the New York Mets
 Ashley Higginson (born 1989), middle-distance runner who has made the U.S. team for the 2013 World Championships in Athletics in the 3000 meter steeplechase
 Samuel "Mingo Jack" Johnson (1820–1886), African-American former slave who was falsely accused of rape, brutally beaten and hanged by a mob of white men in Eatontown
 Joe Klecko (born 1953), former player of the New York Jets
 Stephanie Klemons (born 1982), Broadway performer and choreographer, who was the associate choreographer and original dance captain of the Broadway musical Hamilton
 Queen Latifah (born 1970), rapper and actress
 Jacquie Lee (born 1997), singer came in second place on The Voice season 5
 Pat Light (born 1991), former MLB pitcher
 Heather Locklear (born 1961), actress
 John Montefusco (born 1950), ex-major league baseball player who played for the New York Yankees
 Eric Munoz (1947–2009), politician who served in the New Jersey General Assembly from May 2001, where he represented the 21st legislative district, until his death
 Jim Nantz (born 1959), lead NFL and NCAA men's basketball commentator for CBS
 Nicole Napolitano, reality TV star and former cast member on The Real Housewives of New Jersey alongside her twin sister, Teresa
 Patti Scialfa (born 1953), singer-songwriter, musician and member of the E Street Band
 Bruce Springsteen (born 1949), rock and roll legend, who recorded a large part of his album Nebraska in a house he rented in Colts Neck, owns the township's largest equestrian farm and built his home on the farm
 Jon Stewart (born 1962), comedian, writer, producer, director, actor, media critic and former television host
 Alec John Such (1951–2022), musician who was best known as a founding member of the rock band Bon Jovi, and as their bass player from 1983 to 1994
 Hans K. Ziegler (1911–1999), pioneer in the field of communication satellites and the use of photovoltaic solar cells as a power source for satellites

References

External links

Colts Neck Township website

 
1847 establishments in New Jersey
Populated places established in 1847
Township form of New Jersey government
Townships in Monmouth County, New Jersey